William Kurtovic (born 22 June 1996) is a Swedish footballer who plays for HamKam.

Career

Club
In September 2015, Kurtovic signed a new contract with Sandefjord until the end of the 2018 season.

Personal life
Kurtovic was born in Sweden to Marinko Kurtović, a Croatian handball coach, and a Swedish mother, and moved to Norway at a young age. His sister is professional handballer Amanda Kurtović, who represents Norway internationally.

Career statistics

Club

Honours
Sandefjord
 1. divisjon (1): 2014

References

External links
 

1996 births
Living people
People from Karlskrona
Swedish footballers
Sweden youth international footballers
Swedish people of Croatian descent
Sandefjord Fotball players
Swedish expatriate footballers
Expatriate footballers in Norway
Swedish expatriate sportspeople in Norway
Eliteserien players
Association football midfielders
Ullensaker/Kisa IL players
Sportspeople from Blekinge County